Marco Island is a small barrier island in Collier County, Florida, located  south of Naples on the Gulf Coast of the United States. It is the largest barrier island within Southwest Florida's Ten Thousand Islands area, which extends southerly to Cape Sable. Marco Island is home to an affluent beach community with resort amenities.

Two bridges provide road access to the island via Florida State Road 951 and County Road 92. Located on the island is the JW Marriott Marco Island Beach Resort, the Hilton Marco Island Resort, a golf club, a yacht club, a country club, and several parks and nature areas. The  crescent beach on Marco Island is among the widest in Florida and features white sugar sand and shelling opportunities. Beach regulations are in place against litter, noise, glass, and fires. There are two public access locations with parking and amenities (Tigertail and South Beach), a private beach complex for residents (Residents' Beach), and a private parking area for residents (Sarazen Park at South Beach), and two other public access points (with no amenities). Offshore island beaches, such as Keewaydin, are accessible by boat or tour.

Marco Island is a principal city of the Naples–Marco Island Metropolitan Statistical Area. The population was 15,760 at the 2020 census. The population more than doubles in size during the winter season.

Parts of the island have some scenic, high elevations relative to the generally flat south Florida landscape. The island has a tropical climate; specifically a tropical wet and dry or savanna type (Aw under the Köppen system). It is known for its distinct wet and dry seasons, with most of the rainfall falling between the months of June and October.

History

The history of Marco Island can be traced as far back as 500 CE when the Calusa people inhabited the island as well as the rest of southwest Florida.  A number of Calusa artifacts were discovered on Key Marco (an island then adjacent to, and since attached to Marco Island) in 1896 by anthropologist Frank Hamilton Cushing as part of the Pepper-Hearst Expedition. The most notable artifact discovered was the carved wooden "Key Marco Cat," which is now on display at the Smithsonian Institution. The artifact is featured on a 1989 postage stamp.

When Spanish explorers came to the island in the mid-1500s, they gave the island the name La Isla de San Marcos after Gospel writer St. Mark.

Early development of the island began in the late 1800s after the arrival of William Thomas Collier and his family. Collier founded the village of Marco on the island in 1870, and in 1896 Collier's son, William D. "Capt. Bill" Collier, opened a hotel on the island, known today as the Olde Marco Inn.

Clam digging became a major industry on Marco Island and throughout the Ten Thousand Islands in the early 1900s.  The Burnham Clam Cannery began operation near Caxambas Pass in 1903 and operated until 1929. The Doxsee Clam Cannery also operated from 1911 to 1947.

Ferry service began to the island in 1912, which operated between Marco Island and the Isles of Capri. A road on the mainland linked the ferry landing with East Naples (just west of State Road 951). A small piece of this road still exists today and is known as Barefoot Williams Road.

Barron G. Collier (whom Collier County is named after, and of no relation to William T. Collier) purchased a large amount of land on Marco Island in 1922, and in 1927 the island incorporated as Collier City. Collier City was abolished in 1957. James Harvey Doxsee Sr. served as Collier City's only mayor.

Also in 1927, the Atlantic Coast Line Railroad began service to the island after extending their route from Fort Myers and Naples. The railroad ran to the island along the present route of State Road 951. Rail service was discontinued in 1944.

The first vehicle bridge to the island was a small wooden swing bridge built in 1938 near Goodland on the southeast side of the island. Remnants of this bridge can be seen today next to the current Goodland Bridge (built in 1975). The island's ferry service was discontinued after the original Goodland Bridge opened.

Significant development of Marco Island took place in the 1960s that made it into the tourist destination it is known as today. The Mackle brothers of the Deltona Corporation led the development of the island after purchasing large amounts of land there for $7 million. As a result of development, the S.S. Jolley Bridge opened for traffic in 1969.

Marco Island was reincorporated as a city on August 28, 1997.

On September 10, 2017, Hurricane Irma made landfall as a Category 3 hurricane on the island.

On September 29, 2022, Hurricane Ian submerged the entire island after making landfall as a Category 4 hurricane.

Geography

Marco Island is located in southwestern Collier County, along the Gulf of Mexico.

Climate

Demographics

2020 census

As of the 2020 United States census, there were 15,760 people, 8,379 households, and 5,714 families residing in the city.

2010 census

As of the census of 2010, there were 16,413 people, 7,517 households, and 17,134 housing units in the city. There were 14,826 housing units at an average density of 1,402.1 per square mile (12.14 square miles). The racial makeup of the city was 95.9% White, 0.5% African American, 0.1% American Indian, 1.1% Asian and 7.1% Hispanic or Latino.

There were 7,517 households, out of which 9.4% had children under the age of 18 living with them, 46.7% were 65 years of age or older. The average household size was 2.21.

The median income for a household in the city was $73,373, and the per capita income was $52,089.  2.1% of the population were below the poverty level.

Political affiliation 
Marco Island generally supports the Republican Party, as the city is both represented in the House by Republican Byron Donalds and voted in favor of Republican incumbent Donald Trump during the 2020 election at margins varying from 62% to 73% over Democratic nominee Joe Biden. The region, however, voted more so in favor of the Democratic Party than it did during the 2016 election.

Education

The District School Board of Collier County operates the following schools serving Marco Island:
 Marco Island Academy High School
 Marco Island Charter Middle School
 Tommie Barfield Elementary School

Private schools:
 Island Montessori Academy
 Marketplace Mission Learning Center

Transportation

The Marco Island Executive Airport (MRK) provides general aviation service to the area. The closest regularly-scheduled commercial flights to the area arrive at Southwest Florida International Airport.

Marco Island is served by Collier Area Transit's Route #21 and Route #121 (Express: Immokalee to Marco Island)

Notable people

 John Boehner
 Michael Collins, astronaut
 William J. Cullerton, World War II flying ace
 Leighton Meester

See also

 Key Marco

References

External links

 
 Marco Island Living magazine

Articles containing video clips
Cities in Collier County, Florida
Cities in Florida
Former census-designated places in Florida
Populated coastal places in Florida on the Gulf of Mexico